Speedway is a 1968 American musical action film starring Elvis Presley as a racecar driver and Nancy Sinatra (in her last film role) as his romantic interest.

Plot
Steve Grayson (Presley) is a generous NASCAR race car driver with a heart of gold who feels compelled to bail friends and acquaintances out of financial hardship. However, Steve's manager and best friend Kenny Donford, a compulsive gambler, had been mismanaging Steve's winnings to support his gambling habits, landing Steve in deep trouble with the IRS for nonpayment of back taxes and causing many of Steve's valuable possessions to be repossessed. This proves to be a problem for Steve in his efforts to continue racing competitively and support those who depend on his intense generosity.

Enter Susan Jacks (Sinatra), an IRS agent assigned to keep tabs on Steve and apply his future prize money toward his $150,000 debt, but she ends up taking a romantic interest in him as well.

Cast
 Elvis Presley as Steve Grayson
 Nancy Sinatra as Susan Jacks
 Bill Bixby as Kenny Donford
 Gale Gordon as R. W. Hepworth
 William Schallert as Abel Esterlake
 Victoria Paige Meyerink as Ellie Esterlake
 Carl Ballantine as Birdie Kebner
 Ross Hagen as Paul Dado
 Charlotte Considine as Lori
 Sandy Reed as Speedway Announcer

Production 

Speedway was originally planned as a film to star Sonny & Cher. However, after their first movie, Good Times flopped at the box office, Columbia sold the rights to MGM, which retooled it for Elvis. Elvis was paid $850,000 plus 50% of the profits.

Petula Clark and Annette Funicello were offered the lead female role, but both turned it down.

Filming began on 26 June 1967.

Scenes were shot at the Charlotte Motor Speedway in Concord, North Carolina. The film features guest appearances by several of the top stock-car—better known now as NASCAR—drivers of the day including Richard Petty, Buddy Baker, Cale Yarborough, Tiny Lund and more. They were shown individually with their names in the film's opening credits.

This would be the final "formula" musical film of Presley's career. His remaining films would be less musical and more adult in tone.

Steve Grayson's generosity portrayed in the film was based loosely on Presley's real-life generosity, in which Presley would give cars, homes, and other expensive items to Memphis Mafia members (the media's nickname for his close group of friends and coworkers), family and friends, and even total strangers.

Release
Although the film was completed in the early summer of 1967, it was not released in theaters until June 1968. It was a box-office success placing at #40 for the year on the Variety weekly national box office list.

The only guitar to be featured in the film is during one of the film's closing scenes, during the performance of "There Ain't Nothing Like A Song", where a sunburst Fender Coronado is used.

Soundtrack

Reception
By 1968, Presley films had long become formulaic.  Renata Adler of The New York Times wrote that Speedway was "just another Presley movie — which makes no great use at all of one of the most talented, important and durable performers of our time. Music, youth and customs were much changed by Elvis Presley 12 years ago; from the 26 movies he has made since he sang "Heartbreak Hotel" you would never guess it."

A review in Variety declared: "Under Norman Taurog's know-how comedy direction even some of the silliness in the Phillip Shuken script gets by as entertainment, but the story lacks the legitimacy of the better Presley starrers. However, with Presley in there swinging in his usual style and his own particular brand of lightness the feature stacks up as an okay entry."

Roger Ebert gave the film two stars out of four, writing: "'Speedway' is pleasant, kind, polite, sweet and noble, and if the late show viewers of 1988 will not discover from it what American society was like in the summer of 1968, at least they will discover what it was not like."

Kevin Thomas of the Los Angeles Times wrote that the film "has a script that ran out of gas before Elvis Presley was born. Presley pictures can be unpretentious fun, but this one is both uninspired and too much of an imitation of too many of his previous movies ... There aren't even very many songs to break up developments too predictable to outline here." He thought Nancy Sinatra's one song was "the high point of the picture."

Home media
Speedway was released to DVD by Warner Home Video on August 7, 2007 as a Region 1 widescreen DVD.

See also
List of American films of 1968

References

External links
 
 
 Review of Speedway by Bill Treadway at DVD Verdict, 3 August 2004.
 Review of Speedway by Jeff Rosado at digitallyOBSESSED!, 1 August 2004.

1968 films
1960s musical comedy-drama films
American musical comedy-drama films
American auto racing films
Films directed by Norman Taurog
Films shot in North Carolina
Films shot in California
Metro-Goldwyn-Mayer films
1968 comedy films
1968 drama films
1960s English-language films
1960s American films